Trout Inn may refer to:

 The Trout Inn, Oxfordshire, England
 Trout Inn, Lechlade, Gloucestershire, England